Eye of the Spider is a 1971 Italian crime film directed by Roberto Bianchi Montero and starring Klaus Kinski.

Cast
 Klaus Kinski - Hans Fischer
 Antonio Sabàto - Paul Valéry / Frank Vogel
 Van Johnson - Prof. Orson Krüger
 Romalı Perihan - (as Perihan)
 Lucretia Love - Gloria
 Teodoro Corrà
 Goffredo Unger - (as Fredy Unger)
 Franco Marletta
 Claudio Biava
 Brigitte Brandt
 W. E. Arnold

Style
Despite the title and posters imagery which makes the film sound like a giallo, Italian film historian Roberto Curti referred to the film as a "rather typical film noir"

Release
Eye of the Spider was released on 1 November 1971 in Italy. Due to the growing popularity of and commercial success of the poliziotteschi through the 1970s, the film was re-released as Caso Scorpio: sterminate quelli della calibro 39. The film grossed 133,333,000 Italian lire domestically.

See also
 Klaus Kinski filmography
 List of crime films of the 1970s
 List of Italian films of 1971

Notes

References

External links

Eye of the Spider at Variety Distribution

1971 films
1970s Italian-language films
1971 crime films
Films directed by Roberto Bianchi Montero
Films scored by Carlo Savina
Italian crime films
1970s Italian films